The  is an automobile nameplate used by the Japanese automobile manufacturer Nissan between 2004 and 2016 for two small car models:

 Nissan Latio/Tiida Latio, a subcompact/compact car sold in Southeast Asia and Japan from 2004 to 2012
 Nissan Latio, a rebadged Nissan Almera sold in Japan as a captive import from 2012 to 2016

Latio
Cars introduced in 2004